Prachetasa   is considered to be one of the most mysterious figures of Hindu mythology. It is an epithet for Varuna the god of water and its principle and as such are related to ‘shatabhoisag’  asterism. According to the puranas Prachetasa was one of the 10 Prajapatis who were ancient sages and law gives. But there is also a reference to 10 Prachetas who were sons of Prachinabarthis and great grandsons of Prithu.  It is said that they lived for 10,000 years in a great ocean, very deeply engaged in meditation upon Vishnu and obtained from Him the boon of becoming the progenitors of mankind. They married a girl named Manisha, a daughter of Kanclu .  Daksha was their son.  But according to another version it is said that Prajapathi Daksha an ancient sage and contemporary of Lord Shiva, gave his 27 daughters in marriage to Soma ( Chandra). Soma was the son of father Atri and mother Anusūyā. But it is also said that Daksha was also the son of a woman called Marichi. Marichi is again referred to as the mother of Daksha. Thus it appears that Prachetasas were Daksha's fathers as well as Daksha's great-grandsons. This confusion arises in Hindu families essentially because children are often named after their grandfather or great grandfather.}}

References
Preface, Pandava Svargarohanam,Harikatha, Jeereddi Chennareddi gari rachana, Proddatur, kadapa district. 

Characters in Hindu mythology